Thomas Chittenden (January 6, 1730August 25, 1797) was an American politician from Vermont, who was a leader of the territory for nearly two decades. He was the state's first and third governor, serving from 1778 to 1789—when it was a largely unrecognized independent state called the Vermont Republic—and again from 1790 until his death. Vermont was admitted to the Union in 1791 as its 14th state.

Early and personal life
Chittenden was born in East Guilford in the Colony of Connecticut on January 6, 1730. He married Elizabeth Meigs on October 4, 1749, in Salisbury, Connecticut. They had four sons and six daughters while they were living in Connecticut, all of whom survived to adulthood.

Career
Chittenden was a justice of the peace in Salisbury and a member of the Colonial Assembly from 1765 to 1769. He served in Connecticut's 14th Regiment of Militia from 1767 to 1773, rising to the rank of colonel.

Chittenden moved to the New Hampshire Grants, now Vermont, in 1774, where he was the first settler in the town of Williston. In 1777, a convention was held in Windsor which drafted Vermont's first constitution, establishing Vermont as an independent republic. During the American Revolution, Chittenden was a member of a committee empowered to negotiate with the Continental Congress to allow Vermont to join the Union. The Congress deferred the matter to avoid antagonizing the states of New York and New Hampshire, which had competing claims against Vermont. During the period of the Vermont Republic, Chittenden served as governor from 1778 to 1789 and 1790 to 1791, and was one of the participants in a series of delicate negotiations with British authorities in Quebec over the possibility of establishing Vermont as a British province.

After Vermont entered the federal Union in 1791 as its 14th state, Chittenden continued as governor until his death in 1797.

Death
Chittenden died in Williston on August 25, 1797, and is interred at Thomas Chittenden Cemetery, Williston, Chittenden County, Vermont. Citing Vermont's tumultuous founding, his epitaph reads: "Out of storm and manifold perils rose an enduring state, the home of freedom and unity."

Legacy and honors
In 1894, a monument to Chittenden was begun at the entrance to the cemetery in Williston which is named for him; it was dedicated in 1896.  An engraved portrait of Chittenden can be found just outside the entrance to the Executive Chamber, the ceremonial office of the governor, at the Vermont State House at Montpelier.  The portrait is based on a likeness of one of Chittenden's grandsons, who was believed to resemble Chittenden.  In the late 1990s, a bronze sculpture of Chittenden, which was created by Frank Gaylord, was placed on the grounds of the State House near the building's west entrance.  Another Chittenden statue, also created by Gaylord, was erected in front of the Williston Central School.  Chittenden County is named for him, as is the town of Chittenden in Rutland County.

See also
Vermont Republic
Constitution of Vermont
List of governors of Vermont

References

External links

Vermont Governor Thomas Chittenden – National Governors Association

1730 births
1797 deaths
People from Madison, Connecticut
Chittenden family
Governors of Vermont
Vermont Republic
People from Williston, Vermont
People of Vermont in the American Revolution
Governors of the Vermont Republic
People of pre-statehood Vermont